The Polish Military Cemetery at Casamassima,  was established in Casamassima, near Bari, in southern Italy, where there are about 431 graves of Polish soldiers and officers of the 2nd Polish Corps who died between 1944 and 1945. This small cemetery, mostly "Italian" in style, with decorative trees, is typical of the Mediterranean region and is located among surrounding vineyards.

Set in the middle of the cemetery, is an altar with the inscription:  Heroes, not broken by the force of law — bravely and nobly died. Combatants who are buried there either died on the Gustav Line on the Sangro River, or had been wounded there or at Battle of Monte Cassino, and or had died either in hospitals in Bari or Naples.

The commander of the Westerplatte Garrison at the Battle of Westerplatte, Major Henryk Sucharski was buried there when he died in 1946. At the entrance gate, visitors are reminded of the words of Paul, the Apostle of Nations: I have fought a good fight, I have finished my course, I have kept the faith...

During one of Cardinal Stefan Wyszynski's visits to Italy, on 4 June 1957, he visited the cemetery at Casamassima. He spoke the following words during this visit, expressing his great respect for their dedication to their homeland:

The cemetery is maintained by the municipality of Casamassima and the Polish Honorary Consul General in Bari, Italy.

In addition to soldiers from the 2nd Polish Corps, the Cemetery contains the remains of 15 members of the Polish Air Force, members of the 1586 Special Operations Flight, operating supply drops to Poland from the RAF base at Brindisi. They were the crews aboard Liberators BZ589 and BZ949.

See also
 Polish Cemetery at Monte Cassino
 Polish Cemetery in Bandar-e Anzali
 Brigadier General Henryk Sucharski formerly Major Henryk Sucharski...

References

External links
Location Map of the Polish Military Cemetery at Casamassima
 
 Article (in Italian) about the Polish Military Cemetery at Casamassima.
 5 photos of the Polish Military Cemetery at Casamassima or Cimitero Militare Polacco di Casamassima
 Article about the Polish Military Cemetery at Casamassima (in Polish) on the Polish Wikipedia. with the quote by Cardinal Stefan Wyszyński.
List of Polish airmen AircrewRemembered.com

War cemeteries in Italy
Metropolitan City of Bari
Casamassima
Poland in World War II
Italy–Poland relations